Takumi (匠) is a Japanese word meaning "artisan". It is also a masculine Japanese given name or a surname using various kanji characters. The given name can also be written in hiragana or katakana.

Possible writings
Takumi can be written using different kanji characters and can mean:
as a given name
匠, "artisan"
巧, "adroit"
工, "skill"
卓美, "eminent, beauty"
卓巳, "eminent, serpent"
巧海, "adroit, sea"
拓海, "clear (the land), sea"
拓未, "clear (the land), future"
拓巳, "clear (the land), serpent"
拓実, "clear (the land), fruit"

as a surname
琢己
宅見

People
with the given name Takumi
, Japanese footballer
, Japanese sport wrestler
, Japanese professional baseball pitcher
, Japanese former racing cyclist
, Japanese footballer
Takumi Fujiwara (sailor) (born 1962), Japanese sailor 
, Japanese film director
, Japanese former footballer
, Japanese footballer
, Japanese basketball player
, Japanese footballer
, Japanese former football player
, Japanese footballer
Takumi Horiuchi (born 1949), Japanese sailor
, Japanese professional wrestler 
, Japanese retired basketball player 
, Japanese professional shogi player
, Guamanian footballer
, Japanese printmaker
, Japanese actor, singer, and model
, Japanese professional footballer
, Japanese footballer
, Japanese professional golfer
, Japanese footballer
, Japanese former baseball outfielder
, Japanese footballer
, Japanese sprinter
, Japanese professional baseball player
, Japanese baseball player
, Japanese footballer
, Japanese footballer
, Japanese footballer
, Japanese female singer
, Japanese footballer
, Japanese former football player
, Japanese footballer
, Japanese footballer
, Japanese footballer 
, Japanese footballer 
, Japanese footballer
, Japanese mixed martial artist
, Japanese video game writer
, Japanese footballer 
, Japanese politician
, Japanese triathlon athlete
, Japanese professional baseball catcher 
, Japanese professional baseball player
, Japanese professional baseball player
, Japanese racewalker
, Japanese actor and filmmaker
, Japanese footballer
, Japanese footballer
, Japanese footballer
, Japanese football player 
, Japanese motorcycle racer 
, Japanese professional wrestler 
, Japanese football player
, Japanese football player
, Japanese bartender
, Japanese footballer
, Japanese footballer
, Japanese baseball player
, Japanese footballer
, Japanese voice actor
Takumi Kawanishi (川西 拓実, born 1999), Japanese idol, member of JO1

with the surname Takumi
, Japanese yakuza
Namuchi Takumi (たくみなむち), Japanese manga artist 
, Japanese video game developer
, Japanese actor and voice actor

Fictional characters
Takumi Fujiwara, the main character of the manga and anime series Initial D
Takumi Hayami, from Sky Girls
Takumi Ichinose (巧), a character in the manga and anime series Nana
Takumi Kisaragi (タクミ), a character in the anime series Gad Guard
Takumi Mayama (巧), a character in the manga, anime, and TV drama series Honey and Clover
Takumi Tokiha (巧海), a character in the anime series My-HiME and My-Otome
Takumi Tsuzuki, a character in the anime series Mayoi Neko Overrun!
Takumi Usui, a character in the manga and anime series Kaichou wa Maid-sama!
Takumi Aldini, a character from Shokugeki no Soma
Takumi (Hiroman), a character from Stitch!
Takumi, a character from the video game Fire Emblem Fates
Takumi Inui, a character from the Japanese show Kamen Rider 555
Takumi Mukai, a character from the Japanese video game and anime series THE iDOLM@STER
Takumi Someya, a character from the video game Yakuza 6: The Song of Life
Takumi Aiba, a character/protagonist from the Japanese video game, Digimon Story Cyber Sleuth
Takumi Shinada, a character from Delicious Party Pretty Cure

Other uses
 ''Takumi-kun, a Japanese novel series
Takumi Corporation, a Japanese video game company
10617 Takumi, a main-belt asteroid

Japanese-language surnames
Japanese masculine given names